Omar Hashim Epps (born July 20, 1973) is an American actor, rapper, and producer. He has been awarded nine NAACP Image Awards, two Teen Choice Awards, one MTV Movie Award, one Black Reel Award, and one Screen Actors Guild Award. Epps's film roles include Juice, Higher Learning, The Wood, In Too Deep, and Love & Basketball. His television work includes the role of Dr. Dennis Gant on the medical drama series ER, J. Martin Bellamy in Resurrection, Dr. Eric Foreman on the Fox medical drama series House from 2004 to 2012, and Isaac Johnson in the TV series Shooter from 2016 to 2018.

Early life
Omar Epps was born in Brooklyn, New York. His parents divorced during his childhood and he was raised by his mother, Bonnie Maria Epps, an elementary school principal. He lived in several Brooklyn neighborhoods while growing up (Bedford-Stuyvesant, East New York, and East Flatbush). He began writing poetry, short stories and songs at the age of ten and attended the prestigious Fiorello H. LaGuardia High School of Music & Art and Performing Arts,  New York City's highly-selective public high school for students with talent. Before he started acting, he belonged to a rap group called Wolfpack, which he formed with his cousin in 1991.

Career
In 1992, Epps made his feature film debut playing a DJ alongside rapper Tupac Shakur as the star of cinematographer Ernest Dickerson's directorial film debut Juice. The following year, Epps played one of several roles as an athlete, the first as a running back in the college football drama The Program alongside James Caan. In 1994, he returned to sports, as co-star of Major League II, taking over the role of center fielder Willie Mays Hayes from its originator, a then-unknown Wesley Snipes. His next athletic endeavor was playing a track and field star in John Singleton's Higher Learning, a look at the politics and racial tensions of college life. Epps led the cast in the 1996 BBC/HBO film Deadly Voyage, as a Ghanaian attempting to hide with other stowaways on a major commercial vessel leaving Africa. He won the best actor award at the Monte Carlo Television Festival for portraying Kingsley Ofusu in this true story about the plight of undocumented African stowaways hoping to reach America.

In his network television debut, Epps guest starred as Dr. Dennis Gant, a surgical intern struggling with depression, on the hit medical drama ER for several episodes in its third season. After his television work on ER, Epps returned to film in 1997 with a role as a giddy moviegoer, on a date with a woman played by Jada Pinkett Smith, who ends up an early victim of a psychopathic slasher in the blockbuster sequel Scream 2. Also in 1997, Epps starred in the fact-based HBO movie First Time Felon as a small-time criminal who goes through Chicago's boot camp reform system and undertakes a heroic flood rescue, only to be faced with the adjustment of re-entering society with the mark of ex-con. In 1999, Epps was cast as Linc in The Mod Squad. While The Mod Squad proved a critical and box-office bust, Epps's later 1999 effort The Wood offered him a serious and multi-dimensional role as Mike Tarver, narrator and lead of this critically-acclaimed coming-of-age ensemble comedy. Following a group of middle-class African Americans from youth to adulthood, the debut effort from director-screenwriter Rick Famuyiwa co-starred Richard T. Jones and Taye Diggs. Also in 1999, Epps was featured alongside Stanley Tucci and LL Cool J, playing an undercover detective who finds himself caught up in the illegal goings-on he is investigating in In Too Deep. 

In 2000, Epps starred in Love & Basketball, featuring Alfre Woodard and Sanaa Lathan. He portrayed Quincy, the NBA hopeful who has a stormy relationship with an equally adept female basketball star Monica, played by Lathan. Epps followed with supporting roles in a wide range of films, including Dracula 2000, Big Trouble, and the telepic Conviction. He had a leading role as a gangster in Brother, a movie by the celebrated Japanese actor/director Takeshi Kitano.

In 2004, Epps played the drug-dealer-turned-prizefighter Luther Shaw who falls under the tutelage of boxing promoter Jackie Kallen (Meg Ryan) in the film biopic Against the Ropes. That same year, Epps was a character in the video game Def Jam Fight for NY. Epps also returned to a top-rated medical television drama in 2004, with his role as the brilliant neurologist, Dr. Eric Foreman, who stands his ground medically against the routine barbs of the irascible Dr. House (Hugh Laurie) on the award-winning Fox television series House. The role in the long-running series earned him an NAACP Image Award in 2007, 2008 and 2013 for Outstanding Supporting Actor in a Drama Series. 

In 2014, Epps took on the role of agent J. Martin Bellamy in the ABC television series, Resurrection. The series focuses on a number of individuals who return from the dead, and change the lives of their families and friends in Arcadia, Missouri. 

In July 2020, Epps starred in the Netflix psychological thriller Fatal Affair. In 2022, it was announced that Epps would star in the Lee Daniels' horror/thriller The Deliverance alongside Mo'Nique, Andra Day, Miss Lawrence, and Tasha Smith.

Personal life
Epps married singer Keisha Spivey, from the R&B group Total, in 2006. They have two children, daughter K'mari Mae and son Amir. He also has a daughter, Aiyanna, from a previous relationship.

He is fluent in Spanish and French.

The 1997−1999 theme song used for the sitcom The Wayans Brothers was co-produced by Epps, with Marlon and Shawn Wayans.

In a 2018 interview, Epps denied the long-standing rumor that he is related to fellow actor Mike Epps, saying, "Me and Mike Epps ain't related, though, we spoke like, 'Where you from? Where you from?'"

Epps authored an autobiographical book titled From Fatherless to Fatherhood that was released by Lulu Publishing in June 2018.

Epps serves on the Cultural Council of RepresentUs, a nonprofit organization that focuses on passing anti-corruption laws in the United States. In June 2020, he narrated an educational video for the organization about America's criminal justice system.

Filmography

Film

Television

Discography
 Omar Epps Presents... The Get Back (2004)

References

External links

1973 births
Living people
Male actors from New York City
American male child actors
African-American male rappers
American male film actors
American male television actors
Fiorello H. LaGuardia High School alumni
Rappers from Brooklyn
20th-century American male actors
21st-century American male actors
African-American male actors
20th-century American rappers
21st-century American rappers
20th-century American male musicians
21st-century American male musicians
20th-century African-American musicians
21st-century African-American musicians